Acacia latifolia is a shrub belonging to the genus Acacia and the subgenus Juliflorae that is endemic to tropical parts of northern Australia.

Description
It blooms from May and July to August or October producing yellow flowers. The linear brown seed pods that form after flowering have a linear shape with straight sides.

Taxonomy
It was first formally named by the botanist George Bentham in 1842 as part of William Jackson Hooker's work Notes on Mimoseae, with a synopsis of species as published in the  London Journal of Botany. It was reclassified as Racosperma latifolium by Leslie Pedley in 1987 and then transferred back to genusAcacia in 2001.

Distribution
It is native to several small areas in the Kimberley region of Western Australia growing is sandy soils over sandstone. It also has a disjunct distribution in the top end of the Northern Territory and the north western corner of Queensland. It is often found on sandstone plateaux, on cliffs and along watercourses in gullies or in crevices amongst rocky outcrops. It is found around basalt or quartzite growing in stony, sandy and alluvial soils as a part of mixed shrubland communities.

See also
 List of Acacia species

References

latifolia
Acacias of Western Australia
Plants described in 1842
Taxa named by George Bentham
Flora of the Northern Territory
Flora of Queensland